Tavernerio is a comune (municipality) in the Province of Como in the Italian region Lombardy, located about  north of Milan and about  east of Como.  

Tavernerio borders the following municipalities: Albese con Cassano, Como, Faggeto Lario, Lipomo, Montorfano, Torno.

References

Cities and towns in Lombardy